Justin Clarkson (born 5 October 1968) is a former Australian rules footballer who played with the Sydney Swans in the Australian Football League (AFL).

Clarkson played under-19s football for Melbourne.

He made three appearances for Sydney in 1991, against Footscray, Essendon and St Kilda.

Clarkson was later drafted by Carlton, from Ormond Amateurs, but only played in the reserves.

References

External links
 
 

1968 births
Living people
Australian rules footballers from Victoria (Australia)
Sydney Swans players
Ormond Amateur Football Club players